Nogent-le-Roi is a commune in the department of Eure-et-Loir in the Centre-Val de Loire region in France.

It is located 27 kilometres north of Chartres and 18 kilometres south-east of Dreux.

Population

International relations
The town is twinned with Heddesheim near Mannheim in Germany.

See also
Communes of the Eure-et-Loir department

References

External links

Official site

Communes of Eure-et-Loir
Carnutes